Jaime Antonio Jairala Vallazza, more commonly known as Jimmy Jairala (born 26 September 1957) is an Ecuadorian politician who is leader of the Democratic Center Movement.

References 

1957 births
Living people
Leaders of political parties in Ecuador

21st-century Ecuadorian politicians
Members of the National Congress (Ecuador)
Provincial Prefects of Guayas Province